Tulip is an unincorporated community in Adams County, in the U.S. state of Ohio.

History
A post office called Tulip was established in 1899, and remained in operation until 1954.

References

Unincorporated communities in Adams County, Ohio
1899 establishments in Ohio
Unincorporated communities in Ohio